Flora Velma Abbott (May 29, 1929 – January 1, 1987) was a utility infielder who played in the All-American Girls Professional Baseball League. Listed at 5' 2", 110 lb., she batted and threw right handed.

A native of Regina, Saskatchewan Abbott was one of the sixty eight girls from Canada who played in the All-American Girls Professional Baseball League during its 12-year history. A light-hitting reserve player, she was able to play at second base and third and showed speed on the bases, while playing for four different teams in a span of two years.

Before joining the league, Abbott played in California with the Alameda Girls, a twice World Champion in amateur softball. She entered the AAGPBL in 1946, dividing her playing time between the Kenosha Comets, Peoria Redwings and Rockford Peaches. She posted a collective .178 batting average in 52 games, driving in five runs while scoring 15 times.

Abbott opened the 1947 season with the Fort Wayne Daisies, playing for them as a regular at third base. She hit .141 with 27 runs and 15 RBI, including 18 stolen bases and her only career home run.

Career statistics
Batting

Fielding

Facts
It was a neglected chapter of sports history, at least until , when was inaugurated a permanent display at the Baseball Hall of Fame and Museum at Cooperstown, New York, which is dedicated to the entire league rather than any individual figure.

After that, filmmaker Penny Marshall premiered her 1992 film A League of Their Own, a fictional history centered in the first season of the AAGPBL. Starring Geena Davis, Tom Hanks, Madonna, Lori Petty and Rosie O'Donnell, this film brought a rejuvenated interest to the extinct league.

Abbott and the other girls that represented Canada in the AAGPBL form part of the aforementioned display at Cooperstown.

Sources

1929 births
1987 deaths
All-American Girls Professional Baseball League players
Baseball people from Saskatchewan
Baseball second basemen
Baseball third basemen
Canadian expatriate baseball players in the United States
Canadian female baseball players
Fort Wayne Daisies players
Kenosha Comets players
Peoria Redwings players
Rockford Peaches players
Sportspeople from Regina, Saskatchewan
20th-century American women